Jose Maria Carreño Blanco (19 March 1792 in Cúa – 18 May 1849 in Caracas) was a Venezuelan politician and military person. He was vice-president in the government of José María Vargas, and provisional president of Venezuela as interim caretaker in 1837.

Biography
Jose Maria Carreño lent his shirt to Simón Bolívar, right after his death. There is little information about Carreño Blanco.

On 20 January 1837, in agreement with the constitution, concluded the period of Andrés Narvarte, being designated as president of Venezuela. Jose Maria Carreño, in his position of vice-president of the Government Council, exerted his functions with the collaboration of Felipe Fermín Paul, the Minister of the Interior, José Felix Blanco in the War and Navy Ministry, and Manuel Maria Echeandía in Outer Relations.

On 11 March 1837, Carlos Soublette was designated vice-president of Venezuela, and on 10 April, of that year, assumed the presidency of the Republic, a position that Soublette carried out until concluding the constitutional period that Vargas initiated in 1835.

José María Carreño was a Mason in the 3rd degree. Carreño died on 18 May 1849 in Caracas, Venezuela.

See also 

Presidents of Venezuela
List of presidents of Venezuela

References

Presidents of Venezuela
Venezuelan soldiers
1792 births
1849 deaths
People from Cúa
Venezuelan people of Spanish descent
Burials at the National Pantheon of Venezuela